New Hall Bridge Halt railway station was a station on the East Lancashire line between Brierfield and Burnley in Lancashire, England. It was situated near New Hall Street in Burnley and was closed in 1948 to passengers. The line remains open between Colne and Burnley, however nothing remains of the halt.

References

Closed railway lines in England
Railway stations in Great Britain opened in 1906
Railway stations in Great Britain closed in 1948
Former Lancashire and Yorkshire Railway stations